Kashim Biri was the mai or King of Kanem during the middle of the thirteenth century. During his reign the Maliki school of Law was firmly established and he constructed a Madrashah in the kingdom.

Rulers of the Kanem Empire
13th-century monarchs in Africa